KAHE (95.5 FM, "Super Hits 95.5/1470") is a radio station broadcasting an oldies music format. Licensed to Dodge City, Kansas, United States, the station serves the Southwest Kansas area. The station, established in 1966, is currently owned by Rocking M Media, LLC.

History
The station was launched in May 1966 as KGNO-FM.  On May 2, 1980, the station changed its call sign to KDCK, again on December 20, 1993, to KOLS, and on January 1, 2008, to KAHE.

Previous logo

References

External links
Rocking M Radio

AHE
Oldies radio stations in the United States
Radio stations established in 1966
Ford County, Kansas